Medisterpølse, medisterkorv or simply medister, is a Scandinavian specialty food consisting of a thick, spiced sausage made of minced pork and suet (or lard), stuffed into a casing. It is a slightly sweet-tasting sausage and the finely-ground meat is seasoned with chopped onion, allspice, cloves, salt and pepper.
 It is a traditional dinner sausage in Danish and Norwegian cuisine.

The word medister is derived from a combination of med and ister, respectively meaning 'with' and 'suet'. It was first used in print in a Swedish housekeeping book from the early 16th century. The sausage recipe has changed since then as the meat filling used to be hand-chopped with a knife, while today it is chopped very finely by machine, giving the sausage a different texture. It is made in one very long piece and then cut up after cooking, before serving. In contrast to many other types of sausage, medister is kept fresh and only cooked or fried during the final preparation. For this reason medister must be kept cool (or frozen) until preparation.

See also

 Klobasa
 List of pork dishes
 List of sausages

References

Danish sausages
Pork dishes
Danish cuisine
Norwegian cuisine
Swedish cuisine
Fresh sausages